All That We Have Now is the second studio album by Japanese electronicore band Fear, and Loathing in Las Vegas. It was released on 8 August 2012 through VAP. This is the last release to feature founding member Mashu on bass. He left the band in 2013, and was later replaced by Kei. The album's title, All That We Have Now, says that they have become their culmination content so far. The album reached number 4 on Oricon chart, sold 23,525 copies in its first week release. The single of the album, "Just Awake", originally recorded in Japanese, was later released with an English version. It was used as the first ending theme of the Hunter × Hunter reboot anime.

Track listing

Personnel
Fear, and Loathing in Las Vegas

 So – clean vocals, backing unclean vocals, programming
 Minami – unclean vocals, rapping, keyboards, programming
 Sxun – lead guitar, backing vocals
 Taiki – rhythm guitar, backing vocals
 Mashu – bass
 Tomonori – drums, percussion

Additional personnel
 Yasutaka Hibi – production, mixing
 Yasuhisa Kataoka – production, mixing
 Tuckey – mastering
 Kentaro Tanaka – A&R
 Kai Kuzuyama – management
 Takashi Watanabe – package coordination
 Keisuke Nishina – sales promotion
 Takehiro Kobayashi – web promotion
 Yutty – art direction, design
 Yuji Ono – photography

Charts

Album

Single

References

External links
 

Fear, and Loathing in Las Vegas (band) albums
2012 albums